The sharptail mola (Masturus lanceolatus) is a species of mola found circumglobally in tropical and temperate waters. It is similar in appearance to the ocean sunfish (Mola mola), but can be distinguished by the projection on its clavus (pseudo-tail). Other common names include sharpfin sunfish, point-tailed sunfish, and trunkfish. Rarely encountered, very little is known of the biology or life history of the sharptail mola. It has recently become important to commercial fisheries operating off eastern Taiwan. This species is the only member of its genus.

Distribution and habitat
The distribution of the sharptail mola is worldwide in tropical and temperate waters. They are primarily inhabitants of the epipelagic zone, but are rarely sighted at the surface, with many of those appearing to be ill and parasite-ridden. One tagged individual in the Gulf of Mexico moved an average of  a day.

Description

It has an oval body with an evenly convex forehead profile. The eyes are placed more forward on the head than in the genus Mola. The teeth in both jaws are fused into beak-like plates. The dorsal and anal fins are placed posteriorly, and the base of the dorsal fin is longer than that of the anal fin. In place of a caudal fin, the dorsal and anal fins merge into a clavus, formed by 18-20 fin rays. The central rays in the clavus are supported by the last vertebra and form an elongated triangular lobe; some authors believe these rays to be remnants of the larval caudal fin, though this is disputed.

Their skin is covered with small dermal denticles that are finer than those of the ocean sunfish. Their coloration is silvery with the upper parts of the sides grayish brown to blackish. The sides may bear ill-defined dark spots. The dorsal and anal fins are slate gray, while the clavus may have pale blotches. This species is distinguished from the similar Masturus oxyuropterus by its prominent chin, the lack of a concavity above the eyes, and the unequal lengths of the dorsal and anal fin bases. These two forms may represent different sexes of the same species.

Biology and ecology

Robert Collett, who examined some of the first known specimens of sharptail mola, speculated they might represent abnormal ocean sunfishes that had retained larval characteristics. However, the caudal projection is now known to be a secondary development that follows the loss of the primary tail. The swimming mode of the sharptail is similar to that of other ocean sunfishes, using sculling motions of its long dorsal and anal fins to propel itself through the water. The anal fin moves more extensively than the dorsal fin. The small pectoral fins move constantly to control pitch, while the clavus is employed as a rudder.

Juvenile sharptail molas are known to feed on benthic annelids and sponges. Adults likely feed on medusae, siphonophores, ctenophores, and salps, as well as some fishes, crustaceans, and molluscs. Sharptail molas sometimes have remoras attached to the surface of their bodies or inside their buccal cavities. In 1949, a sharptail mola off North Carolina was found with a common remora (Remora remora) wedged inside the gill arches on its right side. This evidently impaired the respiration of the mola, such that it foundered on the beach and was collected by fishermen.

Molas are oviparous and are amongst the most fecund of all fishes. Larval sharptail molas are rounded in shape and develop large pyramidal dermal spines over their bodies, which persist through a prejuvenile phase called the "Molacanthus" stage. In this stage, the body is deep and compressed, with a thin, keel-like structure below the abdominal region. This ridge is made from skin and covered with several rows of small spines. The skin is rough, being covered with small prickles. Their coloration is dark brown on the back, becoming very light on the sides and belly. The lifespan for this species is estimated to be 85 years for males and 105 years for females.

Relationship to humans
Since 2002, promotion of an ocean sunfish festival in Hualien County, Taiwan, has increased demand for the meat of the sunfish (called "mambo fish" after a public vote), whereas before only the intestines and reproductive organs were sold while the rest of the fish was discarded. The month-long April festival draws some 120,000 visitors, and features "101 ways to eat" sunfish. Consequently, catches of sunfishes off eastern Taiwan have risen sharply, with the sharptail mola comprising 90% of the catch. In 2005, 208 tonnes were landed and the annual sunfish catch was valued at US$ one million. The species is caught by set net, drift net, and longline fisheries. The impact of this increased exploitation on sunfish stocks is under investigation.

Discovery of a 450-pound Sharptail mola
On Wednesday 30 November 2022, the carcass of a 450-pound Sharptail mola was found ashore on a beach in North Carolina. It was kept by the North Carolina Museum of Natural Sciences.

References

sharptail mola
Pantropical fish
sharptail mola